E. Purushothaman was an Indian civil servant and administrator. He was the administrator of the town of Mahe from  9 January 1970 to 8 August 1972.

References 

 

Year of birth missing (living people)
Living people
Administrators of Mahe